Zepp or Zepps is the surname of:

 Bill Zepp (born 1946), American retired Major League Baseball pitcher
 Rob Zepp (born 1981), Canadian ice hockey goaltender
 Josh Zepps (formerly Josh Szeps), Australian media personality, political satirist and TV show host
 Katrina Zepps (1918–1980), Australian nurse and educator born in the Russian Empire